Ion Checicheș (18 March 1955 – 2004) was a Romanian gymnast. He competed in eight events at the 1976 Summer Olympics.

References

1955 births
2004 deaths
Romanian male artistic gymnasts
Olympic gymnasts of Romania
Gymnasts at the 1976 Summer Olympics
Sportspeople from Reșița